The Florida Gators football program is a college football team which represents the University of Florida. The Florida Gators compete in the NCAA Division I Football Bowl Subdivision (FBS) of the National Collegiate Athletic Association (NCAA), and the Eastern Division of the Southeastern Conference (SEC). Over 400 players have been drafted in the National Football League Draft, with 29 of them making a Pro Bowl, and 2 of those players making it to the Pro Football Hall of Fame.

Key

Selections

American Football League

National Football League

Notable undrafted players

See also

 Florida Gators football statistical leaders
 List of Florida Gators football All-Americans
 List of University of Florida Athletic Hall of Fame members
 List of Florida Gators head football coaches

References

Florida
football NFL